Mount Jackson is a small village in Lawrence County, Pennsylvania. The population is approximately 1000. The North Beaver Fire Department, municipal buildings, Mount Jackson Presbyterian Church, and a recycling center are located there.

History

In 1815 pioneering settler John Nesbit laid out the village of Mount Jackson in North Beaver Township, in what later became Lawrence County, Pennsylvania. He named the settlement in honor of U.S. Army General Andrew “Old Hickory” Jackson, recent hero of the War of 1812 – who later ascended to serve as the President of the United States from 1829-1837. The small village grew with a post office, a school, several stores and mills, and two Presbyterian churches.

According to Our Legacy, a history book written by Don Fox in 1990, Major Edward Wright is credited as being the earliest known resident. The early settlers were primarily Scotch-Irish and Presbyterian.

John Nesbit founded Mount Jackson. He laid out the town on his share of a farm in about 1815. The law then required that in order for the town to be incorporated, it needed a post office so application was made to the state Legislature.

A stage line went through Mount Jackson to Enon Valley. For some years this was the only way for people of New Castle to travel on the train, as Enon Valley was the end of the tracks and the only station in the area.

North Beaver Township had been formed in 1810 and Mount Jackson was widely accepted as the focal point of the township.

The first house on the town plot was built by William Henry, who had been living on Hickory Creek, a short distance from town. He also was the first postmaster.

George Eckles was the first blacksmith. But even into the 1940s, there were still blacksmiths around

Joseph Hughes opened the first wagon shop and Benjamin Wells was the first shoemaker. Another home was used as a tavern.

While those faded from view a long time ago, a few businesses such as Miller's Furniture Barn and Wes's Heating and Cooling remain as do Mount Jackson Presbyterian and Westfield Presbyterian churches.

A number of roads in Mount Jackson are named after war heroes.

References

Unincorporated communities in Pennsylvania
Unincorporated communities in Lawrence County, Pennsylvania